Barnhart Brothers & Spindler Type Foundry was an American company founded as the Great Western Type Foundry in 1873. It became Barnhart Brothers & Spindler ten years later.  It was a successful foundry known for innovative type design and well designed type catalogs.  Oz Cooper, Will Ransom, Robert Wiebking, and Sidney Gaunt all designed for BB&S.  It was bought out by American Type Founders in 1911 with the proviso that the merger would not take effect for twenty years, so that the employees would have a chance to find new work or retire over time.  The foundry was finally closed in 1933.

Mergers and acquisitions
 Advance Type Foundry (AKA Wiebking, Hardinge & Company), Chicago, bought out by Western Type Foundry in 1914.
 Western Type Foundry, Saint Louis, Missouri, bought by B.B.&S in 1918.

Typefaces
These foundry types were originally cast by Barnhart Brothers & Spindler:

A
 Adcraft 
 Adcraft lightface, 8-48pt, or Puritan, Hansen (8-48pt) ATF 1501
 Adcraft Medium, 6-72pt, ATF 1502
 Adcraft Bold or Plymouth, 6-120pt
 Adcraft Black or Plymouth Bold, 6-72pt, ATF 1500
 Adstyle design: Sidney C. Gaunt, 1906, 6-120pt, ATF 1503
 Adstyle Italic 6-72pt, ATF 1509
 Adstyle Condensed 10-120pt, ATF 1506
 Adstyle Extra Condensed 10-108pt ATF 1507
 Adstyle Wide 6-60pt, ATF 1511
 Ádstyle lightface 
 Adstyle Black 6-96pt, ATF 1504
 Adstyle Outline 12-96pt, ATF 1505
 Adstyle Shaded10-72pt, ATF 1510, Gaunt: 1914 
 Adstyle Borders, design: T. C. Robinson 1908, 7 series, 12-24pt, 
 Special Reversed Figures: Mono 132S (12-18pt)
 Advertisers Gothic, 6-72pt, Design: Robert Wiebking 1917, for Western Type Foundry take over by BB&S in 1919, ATF 1512
 Advertisers Gothic Condensed 6-72pt, ATF 1513
 Advertisers Gothic Outline 6-72pt, ATF 1515
 Advertisers Gothic Condensed Outline 6-72pt, ATF 1514
 Advertisers Upright Script 14-72pt, original name: Oliphant (1895) renamed in 1925, ATF 1516
 Artcraft, design: Robert Wiebking 1912, 6-72pt 
 Artcraft italic, 6-48pt, ATF 1529, Ludlow 10LI 
 Artcraft Bold, 6-72pt, ATF 1528, Ludlow 10-B
 Authors Roman, design: Sidney Gaunt for BB&S in 1902, other versions were added between 1908 and 1915: , 5-72pt, ATF 1531
 Authors Oldstyle Italic, (5-72pt) ATF 1533
 Authors Oldstyle Bold 5-72pt, ATF 1532
 Authors Roman, 5-72pt, ATF 1534
 Authors Roman Italic, 5-72pt, ATF 1530
 Authors Roman Condensed, 6-72pt, ATF 1537
 Authors Roman Wide, 5-48pt, ATF 1538
 Authors Roman Bold, 5-72pt, ATF 1535
 Authors Roman Bold Condensed, 6-72pt, ATF 1536,

B
 Bamboo, original named: Freak, 10-30pt, patented in 1889 by Great Western Type Foundry. in 1925 at BB&S, later copied by Typefounders of Phoenix 18pt 
Bank Script, Spencerian script, design: James West in 1895 for BB&S, 14-48pt, ATF 1540, the next lower case scripts can be used with the capitals of no.1:
Bank Script no.2, lower case alphabet with a larger x-height, 14-38pt, ATF 1712
Bank Script no.3, lower case alphabet wider and with a larger x-height, 14-48pt, ATF 1713
 Barnhart Oldstype, design: Sidney Gaunt (1906) (6-72pt), ATF 1544
 Barnhart Oldstype No.2, (1907) same capitals, larger lower case and shorter descenders, (6-72pt), ATF 1545
 Barnhart Oldstype Italic, (6-72pt) ATF 1546
 Barnhart Lightface, (~1914) BB&S
 Bizarre Bold, designed as Edwards in 1895 by Nicolas J. Werner for Inland Type Foundry, in 1925 renamed by BB&S when the Inland-foundry was taken over, 6-60pt, ATF 1548, Inland, Iland (8-60pt)
 Booknam Light Face, (6-25pt) ATF 1551
 Bookman Bold, (6-72pt) ATF 1549
 Bookman Bold Condensed, (6-72pt) ATF 1550

C
 Cardstyle, design: Sidney Gaunt (1914), no lowercase, intended for use in announcements, capitals are cast in several sizes on all of the three bodies. (6s-15L), ATF 1558 
 Caslon Oldstyle, 6-72pt, ATF 1569
 Caslon Oldstyle Italic, (6-72pt), ATF 1570
 Caslon Italic Specials, (12-72pt), design: Carl S. Junge, 1924
 Caslon Clearface, (6-72pt), ATF 1565
 Caslon Clearface Italic, (6-48pt), ATF 1566
 Caslon Catalog, (6-72pt), ATF 1564
 Caslon Medium, (6-72pt), ATF 1567
 Caslon Medium Italic, (6-72pt), ATF 1568
 Caslon Black, (6-72pt), ATF 1561
 Caslon Black Italic, (6-72pt), ATF 1563
 Caslon Black Condensed, (6-72pt), ATF 1562
 Caslon Openface, (6-72pt), ATF 1571
 Caslon Open Title, (6-72pt), ATF 1572
 Caslon Antique, (8-48pt), ATF 1559
 Caslon Antique Italic, (8-48pt), ATF 1560
 (Caslon) Old Roman, (6-48pt), ATF 1804
 (Caslon) Old Roman Italic, (6-48pt),  
 Century Roman, (6-24pt), design: Linn Boyd Benton, 1894 for Century Magazine. ATF 1576
 Century Italic, (6-24pt), ATF 1575ATF 1810
 Gothic Chamfer, (12-54pt) ATF 1643 
 Cheltenham Oldstyle, (6-72pt), ATF 87
 Cheltenham Italic, (6-72pt), ATF 82
 Cheltenham wide, (6-72pt), ATF 89
 Cheltenham Medium, (6-72pt), ATF 83
 Cheltenham Bold, (6-72), ATF 73
 Cheltenham Bold Italic, (6-72pt), ATF 73
 Cheltenham Bold Condensed, (6-72pt), ATF 68
 Cheltenham Bold Condensed Italic, (6-72pt), ATF 69
 Cheltenham Bold Extra Condensed, (6-120pt), ATF 70
 Cheltenham Bold Extended, (6-72pt), ATF 72 
 Chester Text, 8-14pt, design: Sidney Gaunt 1914, capitals and small capitals, but hard to read, can only used for names and a few words, ATF 1577
 Clarendon No.5, (5-24pt), ATF 1578
 Clarendon Extra Condensed  No.5, (6-36pt), ATF 1580
 Clarendon Medium, (Caledonian No.5) (5-36pt), ATF 1581
 Clarendo Bold, (Lining Doric) (6-48pt), ATF 1579
 Clearcut Oldstyle, (5-72pt), ATF 1582
 Clearcut Oldstyle Italic, (5-72pt), ATF 1584
 Clearcut Oldstyle Condensed, (10-72pt), ATF 1583
 Clearcut Shaded Caps, design: Will Ransom, 1924 (12-48pt), ATF 1585 
 Cooper, (6-72pt), ATF 1589, Mono 482 (8-36pt)
 Cooper Italic, (6-72pt) ATF 1595, Mono 4821 (8-36pt)
 Cooper Black, 6-120pt (1922, design: Oswald Bruce Cooper), ATF 1590
 Cooper Black Italic, (6-120 pt) ATF 1592
 Cooper Black Condensed, (6-120pt), ATF 1591
 Cooper Hilite, (18-120pt), ATF 1594
 Cooper Fullface, (6-72pt), ATF 1593
 Cooper Modern, (6-72pt), ATF 1942
 Cooper Tooled, (18-72pt), Mono 582
 Cooper Tooled Italic, (10-72pt),  
 Copperplate Gothic, design: Frederic W. Goudy, 1903
 Stealplate Gothic Light, (6s-24L) ATF 1867
 Stealplate Gothic Light Extended, (6s-24L) ATF 1865
 Stealplate Gothic Light Condensed, (6s-24L) ATF 1869
 Stealplate Gothic Light Heavy, (6s-24L) ATF 1868
 Stealplate Gothic Italic, (6s-24L) ATF 1871
 Stealplate Gothic Condensed, (6s-24L) ATF 1870
 Stealplate Gothic Heavy Extended, (6s-24L) ATF 1866ATF 1596
 Cubist Bold, design: John W. Zimmerman (~1929), has no lowercase (10-36pt), ATF 1599
 Custer later: Bookman Lightface (6-24pt)
 Custer Bold later: Bookman Bold, (6-72pt)

D
 Demeter (Typeface), (14-48pt), 1925, design: Peter A. Demeter, in cooperation with Schriftguss A.G. in Dresden Germany.
 Dennison Script, (14-48pt), ATF 1602
 De Vinne, 6-72pt, ATF 1602
 De Vinne Compressed, (6-72pt), ATF 1606
 De Vinne Extra Compressed, (10-72pt), ATF 1607
 De Vinne Bold, (6-60pt), ATF 1605 <-!119->
 De Vinne Recut, (6-60pt) revival of Woodward, design: William A. Schraubstädter 1894 for Inland Type Foundry, ATF 1608
 De Vinne Recut Outline, (12-60pt) revival of Woodward Outline, ATF 1609
 Dresden, (12-30pt), design: Peter A. Demeter, ATF 1611

E
 Engravers English, (6-72pt) ATF 1621
 Engravers Old Black, (6-96pt) Design: Sidney Gaunt 1910
 Engravers Roman, (6s-24pt), design: Robert Wiebking 1899, ATF 1627
 Engravers Roman Condensed, (6s-24pt) ATF 1628
 Engravers Bold (6s-36pt), design: Morris Fuller Benton, ATF 1619
 Engravers Title (6s-24pt), ATF 1630
 Engravers Litho Bold, (6-48pt), ATF 1623
 Engravers Litho Bold Condensed, (5-48pt), ATF 1624
 Engravers Bold Condensed (title), (6s-48pt), ATF 1620
 Engravers Roman Shaded, (6s-36pt), ATF 1629
 Engravers Upright Script, (8-30pt), ATF 1631, original: Pen Text No.5 (~1879) of the Cincinnati Type Foundry, renamed by BB&S, while dropping the fancy capitals
 Engravers Gothic, (6s-30pt), ATF 1622, earlier name: Olympia from Inland Type Foundry At ATF classified as a "Typo-face"

F
 Faust Text, (8-36pt), based on uncial lettering, in 1925 renamed: Missal Text
 French Clarendon was a nineteenth-century BB&S face that was re-released in 1938 by ATF as P. T. Barnum. 
 French Oldstyle no.3, (6-18pt) ATF 1639 
 French Oldstyle No.56 (title) (6-48pt) ATF 1640
 French Elsevir Italic No.5, (6-12pt) ATF 1637
 French Plate Script, (14-36pt) ATF 1641

G
 Gothic No.1, (4-72pt), copy of Franklin Gothic of Morris Fuller Benton ATF 1674
 Gothic No.1 Condensed, (6-72pt) ATF 1675
 Gothic No.3, (6-72pt) ATF 1667
 Gothic Extra Condensed No.6, (6-72pt) ATF 1654
 Gothic Extra Condensed Title No.6, (8-60pt) ATF 1655
 Gothic No.47, (6-72pt) 
 Gothic Condensed Title No.117, (5-120pt) ATF 1651
 Gothic Italic or Degree Gothic No.1, (6-24PT) ATF 1600 or 1658
 Gothic Italic Light or Degree Gothic No.2, (5-12pt) ATF 1659
 Gothic Inclined, (6-24pt) ATF 1656
 Gothic Inclined Light, (6-24pt) ATF 1657
 Gothic Novelty, (8-14pt) ATF 1671
 Gothic Novelty Title, (6-24pt) ATF 1673
 Gothic Novelty Condensed, (12-60pt) ATF 1672
 Gothic Outline Title, (12-72pt) ATF 1676
 Gothic Compressed No.8, (10-72pt), ATF 1653
 Gothic Compressed Title No.8, (8-60pt), ATF 1649 
 Greeting Card, (10-24pt) ATF 1683
 Greeting Card Light, (10-24pt) ATF 1684

H
 Handcraft, (6-72pt) ATF 1686
 Handcraft Title, (6-60pt) ATF 1687
 Handcraft Wide Title, (6-30pt) ATF 1688

I, J
 Invitation Text, (6-48pt), desin: Robert Wiebking 1914, ATF 1693
 Japanet, (8-48pt) original name: Wedge Gothic cut in 1893 by BB&S for the Chicago Herald, renamed in 1925, Recast for the ATF in 1954: ATF 1694
 Morris Jensonian, (6-48pt) ATF 1790
 Poor revival of the type of William Morris, 1895-96 first named: Mazarin, later replaced by the Inland's face: Klemscott and renamed.

K
 Kenilworth Italic, (6-48pt) first: Inland Type Foundry 1904, similar to: Cheltenham Oldstyle, BB&S bought the italic matrices, these ended as ATF 1695

L
 Latin Antique, (6-48pt), ATF 1697
 Latin Condensed, (10-72pt), ATF 1698
 Latin Expanded, (6-48pt), ATF 1699
 Latin Lightface, (6-48pt), ATF 1700
 Latin Oldstyle Bold, (6-72pt), ATF 1703
 Light Modern, (24-48pt), ATF 1745
 Law Italic No.5, (8-14pt)

M
 Mazerin No.5, (6-60pt)
 Mazerin Italic, (6-48pt)
 Missal Text, (8-36pt)
 Mission, (6-48pt), design: Sidney Gaunt in 1905, patented by: George Oswald Ottley, ATF 1778
 Modern Gothic, (5-96pt), 1897, ATF 1662
 Modern Gothic Italic, (5-72pt), ATF 1665
 Modern Condensed Gothic, (6-72pt), ATF 1663
 Modern Condensed Gothic Title, (6-120pt), ATF 1664
 Modern No.4 and Italic, (6-12pt) 
 Modern Roman Bold Condensed, (Lining Aldine), (6-48pt), ATF 1781
 Modern Roman Bold Extra Condensed, (Lining Aldine Condensed),(6-48pt), ATF 1781
 Modern Roman Condensed, (Condensed No. 54), (5-48pt), ATF 1782
 Modern Roman Extra Condensed, (Extra Condensed No. 56),(6-48pt), ATF 1783
 Modern Roman Italic, (6-12pt), (Title Italic No.19), ATF 1784
 Modern Roman Lightface, (Lightface No.7), (6-48pt), ATF 1785
 Modern Roman Medium, (5-48pt), (Title No.5), ATF 1786
 Modern Roman Wide, (6-16pt.), (Expanded No.5 or Title Expanded), ATF 1787
 Modern Roman No.64 and Italic, (5-18pt), ATF 1916, ATF 1914
 Modern Roman No.80 and Italic, (5-12pt), ATF 1918, ATF 1915 
 Modern Text, (6-36pt), design: Robert Wiebking (?) ~1913, ATF 1788
 Morris Romanized Black, (6-60pt), introduced as Tell Text in 1895, adaptation of the Troy- and Chaucer types of William Morris, renamed in 1925, ATF 1791
 Murder Venezian, (6-72pt), ATF 1795, design: Robert Wiebking, first shown as: Laclede Oldstyle (1922) by the Laclede Type Foundry in St. Louis
 Murder Italic,(6-72pt), ATF 1794 
 Murder Bold, (6-72pt), ATF 1792
 Murder Bold Italic, (6-72pt), ATF 1793

O
 Old Roman or Caslon Old Roman, (6-72pt), ATF 1840, 
 Old Roman Itallic or Caslon Old Roman Italic, (6-48pt), ATF 1810, 
 Old Roman Condensed, (6-72pt), ATF 1809 
 Old Roman Bold, (6-72pt), ATF 1807 
 Old Roman Bold Condensed, (6-120pt), ATF 1808 
 Old Roman Black, (6-72pt), ATF 1805
 Old Roman Black Italic, (6-48pt), ATF 1807 
 Old Roman Semitone, (18-60pt), ATF 1811

P
 Pantograph Script,  (12-60pt), ATF 1816, upright script introduced in 1893, but shown as late as 1925
 Paragon later: Paragon Plate, (6-24pt), ATF 1817, introduced in 1901
 Paragon Italic or Paragon Plate Italic, (6-24pt), ATF 1818, sloped version of the roman
 Program Italic, offered as a title-version , (6s-24L) ATF 1848 
 Pagram Italic, offered as a title-version , (6s-24L) ATF 1848
 Parsons, (6-72pt), ATF 1819, design: Will Ransom (1917), named after  I. R. Parsons, a Chicago advertising manager
 Parsons Italic, (6-48pt), (1918), ATF 1821, 
 Parsons Bold, (6-72pt), (1918), ATF 1820, 
 Parsons Swash Initials, (18-48pt), design: Sidney Gaunt, 1918
 Pastel, (6-72pt), ATF 1822, design: 1892 by Nicolas J. Werner and Gustav Schroeder first named Era, Lightface Era and Era Open were added in 1895, Era Condensed about 1898.
 Pastel Condensed, (8-72pt) ATF 1824
 Offset Pastel Condensed, (24-72pt), ATF 1801
 Pastel Lightface, (6-72pt), ATF 1825
 Pastel Bold, (5-72pt), ATF 1823
 Pastel Open, (12-60pt), ATF 1826 
 Pekin, (18,30pt) ATF 1827, original name Dormer patented by Great Western Typefoundry in 1888, design: Ernst Lauschke
 Pencraft Oldstyle, (6-72pt), ATF 1829, design: Sidney Gaunt 1914, 
 Pencraft Title, (6s-42pt), ATF 1834
 Pencraft Italic, (6-48pt), ATF 1828
 Pencraft Oldstyle Bold, (6-72pt), ATF 1830
 Pencraft Oldstyle Bold Condensed, (6-72pt), ATF 1831  
 Pencraft Shaded, (24-48pt), ATF 1832
 Pencraft Text, (12-48pt) ATF 1833, design: Sidney Gaunt 1916, 
 Plate Gothic, (6s-36pt), ATF 1836
 Plate Gothic Condensed, (6s-36pt), ATF 1838
 Plate Gothic Light, (6s-36pt), ATF 1839
 Plate Gothic Light Condensed, (6s-36pt), ATF 1840
 Plate Gothic Bold, (6s-12pt), ATF 1837
 Plate Script, (14-48pt), ATF 1841, three sets of lowercase:
 Plate Script No.2, (14-48pt), ATF 1852
 Plate Script No.3, (14-48pt), ATF 1853  
 Plate Text, (8-18pt)
 Plate Text No.2, 
 Plate Text No.3,
 Plate Text No.4, (8-36pt)
 Pompeian Cursive, (12-54pt), design: Oswald Cooper 1927, not shown in the ATF books
 Priory Black Text, (8-48pt), ATF 1847, earlier name: Reed Text
 Publicity Gothic, (6-120pt), ATF 1849, design: Sidney Gaunt, 1916

R
 Rugged Bold, (6-72pt) first named: Talisman, patented by: Sidney Gaunt in 1903, after 1911 renamed to Rugged Bold.
 Rugged Bold Italic, (6-72pt), first named Talisman Italic, patented by: Sidney Gaunt in 1904, after 1911 renamed to Rugged Bold Italic. (6-72pt)
 Rugged Lightface, (8-48pt) ATF 1501, first named Carlton later Adcraft Lightface, 
 Rugged Medium, (6-72pt) ATF 1502, first: Alfred Medium later Adcraft Medium
 Rugged Black, (6-120pt), first: Plymouth
 Rugged Black Italic, (6-72pt), first: Plymouth Italic
 Rugged Black Condensed, (6-72pt), first: Plymouth Condensed
 Rugged Extra Black, (6-72pt), ATF 1500, first: Plymouth Bold and Adcraft Black

S
 Scotch Roman,  (6-48pt), ATF 1856
 Sketch Circular,  (8-14pt) ATF 1859, design: Ed Newman, 
 Sketch Title, (6s-30pt), ATF 1560, (1890), first named: Racine, only capitals, used for announcements. Both series lasted into the late 1920s.
 Spire No.5, (12-72pt), ATF 1861, cut around 1898, bold and condensed face
 Steelplate Gothic Extralight, (6s-24L), ATF 1874, Design: Robert Wiebking
 Steelplate Gothic Light, (6s-24L), ATF 1867
 Steelplate Gothic Light Condensed, (6s-24L), ATF 1869
 Steelplate Gothic Light Extended, (6s-24L), ATF 1865
 Steelplate Gothic Heavy, (6s-24L), ATF 1868
 Steelplate Gothic Heavy Condensed, (6s-24L), ATF 1870
 Steelplate Gothic Heavy Extended, (6s-24L), ATF 1866
 Steelplate Gothic Bold, (6s-24L), ATF 1873
 Steelplate Gothic Shaded, (6s-24L), ATF 1872, (1918), in England known as: Spartan Outline
 Stillson, (6s-36pt), introduced around 1899, patented in 1900 by R. L. Stillson
 Swagger Capitals or: Swagger Initials, (36pt), design: Carl S. Junge 1925, elongated flourish scripts, without X and Z. To be used with various typefaces.

T
 Ternholm Oldstyle, (6-72pt), ATF 1886, design: George F. Trenholm around 1925-1927, after 1929, when BB&S merged with ATF, there is no evidence these matrices were used to cast. Although they were listed in the ATF vaults. 
 Ternholm Cursive, (6-48pt), ATF 1885,
 Ternholm Bold, (6-96pt), ATF 1884,
 Ternholm Shaded Capitals, (12-48pt), ATF 1887,
 Typewriter faces:
 Bernhart Utility Typewriter, ATF 1894
 Improved Typewriter, ATF 1895
 Oliver Printype Typewriter, ATF 1897
 Oliver Standard Silk Typewriter, ATF 1898
 Remington Typewriter, ATF 1899
 Silk Remington Typewriter, ATF 1900
 Reproduction Typewriter, ATF 1902
 Smith Premier Silk Typewriter, ATF 1903
 Underwood New Model Silk Typewriter, ATF 1904
 Yost Typewriter, ATF 1768

W
 Waldorf Text, (14-36pt), ATF 1905, shaded Old English face
 Wedding plate Script, (14-36pt), ATF 1908, design: Sidney Gaunt 1904
 Woodward, (6-60pt), ATF 1608, designed for Inland Type Foundry in 1894 by William A. Schraustädter, named for a Saint Louis printer. In 1911 Inland was taken over by ATF, the equipment was divided between ATF and BB&S. Some time later this face was renamed by BB&S as DeVinne Recut and DeVinne Recut Outline
 Woodward Outline, (12-60pt), ATF 1609
 World Gothic, (6-72pt), design: Robert Wiebking
 World Gothic Italic, (6-72pt), in 1898 introduced as": Dewey No.51, after Admiral George Dewey
 World Gothic Condensed, (6-96pt), in 1897 shown as: Topic No.5

References

External links
 Pages from 1907 catalog on Flickr

Manufacturing companies based in Chicago
Letterpress font foundries of the United States
Companies established in 1873
Defunct companies of the United States